Oleh Oleksiyovych Smolyaninov (born 5 January 1959) is a Soviet and Ukrainian professional football coach and a former player.

Club career
He made his professional debut in the Soviet Second League in 1977 for FC Torpedo Taganrog. He played 1 game in the UEFA Cup 1990–91 for FC Dnipro Dnipropetrovsk.

Honours
 Soviet Cup finalist: 1986.
 USSR Federation Cup finalist: 1990.

External links
 
 Dmitriy Igolinskiy. Oleh Smolyaninov: "Who steps widely, he tears pants" (Олег Смолянинов: «Кто широко шагает, тот штаны рвёт»). Tikhookeanskaya Zvezda (Pacific Ocean Star). 5 January 2019.

1959 births
Living people
People from Alchevsk
Soviet footballers
Ukrainian footballers
Association football midfielders
Soviet Top League players
Russian Premier League players
Ukrainian Premier League players
Ukrainian expatriate footballers
Expatriate footballers in Russia
FC SKA Rostov-on-Don players
FC Elektrometalurh-NZF Nikopol players
FC Shakhtar Donetsk players
FC Zenit Saint Petersburg players
FC Dnipro players
FC Taganrog players
FC Tekstilshchik Kamyshin players
FC Metalurh Zaporizhzhia players
FC Zorya Luhansk players
FC Naftokhimik Kremenchuk players
Bnei Yehuda Tel Aviv F.C. players
Expatriate footballers in Israel
Expatriate footballers in Germany
Expatriate footballers in Austria
Ukrainian football managers
Ukrainian expatriate football managers
FC Stal Alchevsk managers
FC Hirnyk Rovenky managers
FC Shakhtar Makiivka managers
FC SKA-Khabarovsk managers
Expatriate football managers in Azerbaijan
Sportspeople from Luhansk Oblast